The Central District of Mashhad County is a district (bakhsh) in Mashhad County, Razavi Khorasan province, Iran. At the 2006 census, its population was 2,679,938, in 704,045 families.  The district has one city: Mashhad. The district has six rural districts (dehestan): Darzab Rural District, Kardeh Rural District, Kenevist Rural District, Miyan Velayat Rural District, Tabadkan Rural District, and Tus Rural District.

References 

Districts of Razavi Khorasan Province
Mashhad County